The Dent Favre is a mountain in the Bernese Alps, located between the Dent de Morcles and the Grand Muveran. Its summit straddles the border between the Swiss cantons of Vaud and Valais.

References

External links

Dent Favre on Hikr.org

Mountains of the Alps
Mountains of Switzerland
Mountains of the canton of Vaud
Mountains of Valais
Valais–Vaud border
Two-thousanders of Switzerland